The Confederation of Indigenous Nationalities of the Ecuadorian Amazon or CONFENIAE is the regional organization of indigenous peoples in the Ecuadorian Amazon or Oriente region. Nine indigenous peoples present in the region — Quichua, Shuar, Achuar, Huaorani, Siona, Secoya, Shiwiar, Záparo and  Cofán — are represented politically by the Confederation. CONFENIAE is one of three major regional groupings that constitute the Confederation of Indigenous Nationalities of Ecuador (CONAIE). It is also part of the Amazon Basin indigenous organization, COICA.

The group's president (as of 2005) is Luis Vargas Canelo, an Achuar; and its vice president is Nelson Calapucha, a Kichwa. Past leaders form an advisory council (Consejo de Sabios) for the Confederation.

In 2013 the politician Mónica Chuji became the Vice President.

References

External links
 CONFENIAE homepage

Indigenous organisations in Ecuador